WAJB may refer to:

 WAJB-LP, a low-power radio station formerly licensed to Wellston, Ohio.
 the ICAO code for Bokondini Airport, Indonesia